This is a list of professional wrestlers and personalities that performed in the different incarnations of the International World Class Championship Wrestling promotion from:

1985-1991 (as International Championship Wrestling)
1991-1995 (as International World Class Championship Wrestling)

Alumni

Male wrestlers

Female wrestlers

Midget wrestlers

Stables and tag teams

Managers and valets

Commentators and interviewers

Referees

Other personnel

References
General
</ref>

Specific

External links
IWCCW alumni at Cagematch.net
IWCCW alumni at Wrestlingdata.com

International World Class Championship Wrestling alumni